Boran may refer to:
 Boran, a Turkish masculine given name.
Boran, Queen of Sassanid Persia
Boran languages, part of the proposed Bora–Witoto language family
Boran, or Borana people, a pastoralist people in southern Ethiopia and northern Kenya
 Borana language
Boran cattle, a breed of cattle found in eastern Africa and associated with the Borana
Borani, a Persian appetizer with yoghurt.

See also
Bodhrán, Irish frame drum
 Muay Boran, a Thai martial art
 Borana (disambiguation)